Mizpa Pentecostal University is a theological university located in San Juan, Puerto Rico lead and administrated by the Pentecostal Church of God, International Movement of Puerto Rico Region.

Founded in 1937, Mizpa is the oldest Pentecostal theological school in Puerto Rico.

History
In 1937, the Juan L. Lugo founded the Mizpa Bible Institute. The first Pentecostal missionary, Longo established the institute in barrio Santurce in the facilities of the Pentecostal Church of God, International Movement. On January 9, 1939, the first 12 students graduated.  The Institute later moved to barrio Pajaros in Bayamon.

In 1956, Lugo move the institute to the barrio Caimito in Rio Piedras, its current location. . Currently the college community is represented by more than 13 denominations sisters.

In 1985, the Pentecostal Seminary of Puerto Rico (SEPRI) and Mizpa Bible Institute merged under the name of Mizpa Pentecostal College. The new college offered university-level education with associates and bachelor's degrees.

In February 2001, received the status "Initial Accreditation" from the Association for Biblical Higher Education (ABHE).  In February 2006, the ABHE reaffirmed the accreditation of the College for the next ten years.

Programs

Certificates 
Mizpa offers certificate programs in  20 centers across the island

 Chaplaincy
 Christian Education 
 Ministerial Arts

Associate degrees 

 Christian Education 
 Christian Counseling
 Pastoral Theology 
 Missiology

Mizpa offer courses in professional improvement to all pastors who are promoted by the Church of God Pentecostal, M. I. in Puerto Rico. 

At the San Juan campus, students have the opportunity to receive Pell Grants and federal aid via Title IV program.

Directors 

 Rev. Fr. Juan L. Lugo, 
 Reverend. Jose M, Martinez (3 times), 
 Rev. Fr. Benigno Colon, 
 Reverend. Luis C. Otero, 
 Reverend. Ramon Muniz (2 times), 
 Mis. Matilde Roman, Reverend. 
 Juan Caban (2 times), 
 Rev. Fr. Eleuterio Feliciano, 
 Reverend. Esmeraldo Cruz, 
 Reverend. David Ramos, 
 Rev. Joseph O. Santos 
 Dr. Sara Ramos Cartagena

Presidents 

 Dr. Ramón Muñiz 
 Reverend. Reinaldo Arroyo
 Dr. Naomi Rose
 Rev. Luis R. Cruz
 Rev. Daniel Cruz Olivera (since May 2003)

References

Further reading 

 

Pentecostal universities and colleges
Pentecostalism in the United States
Protestantism in Puerto Rico
Seminaries and theological colleges in Puerto Rico
Universities and colleges in Puerto Rico
Education in San Juan, Puerto Rico